Buḍḍhacarya, dhamma name Upaseṇo, born as Kiaw Chokchai, and commonly known as Somdet Kiaw ("His Holiness Kiaw"), was a Thai prelate who was the abbot of Wat Saket and the Acting Supreme Patriarch of Thailand, the effective leader of all Buddhist monks in Thailand. He was appointed Acting Supreme Patriarch in 2005 due to the failing health of the incumbent Supreme Patriarch Nyanasamvara Suvaddhana. He was a monk of the Mahanikaya order, and is of Thai Chinese descent. His appointment provoked severe criticism from Luang Ta Maha Bua (of the Dhammayuttika Nikaya order) and Sondhi Limthongkul, who claimed that the appointment created two Supreme Patriarchs and contravened the royal prerogative of King Bhumibol Adulyadej. On 4 March 2005, Maha Bua even petitioned King Bhumibol Adulyadej to remove all of Kiaw's royal titles.

References

Notes 

 His full dignitarial title was "สมเด็จพระพุฒาจารย์ ภาวนากิจวิธานปรีชา ญาโณทยวรางกูร วิบูลวิสุทธิจริยา อรัญญิกมหาปริณายก ตรีปิฎกบัณฑิต มหาคณิสสร บวรสังฆาราม คามวาสี อรัณยวาสี".

 He was formally styled as "Somdet Phra Buddhacarya (Kiaw Upaseṇo)" [สมเด็จพระพุฒาจารย์ (เกี่ยว อุปเสโณ)].

1928 births
Thai religious leaders
Thai people of Chinese descent
Thai Theravada Buddhist monks
Political history of Thailand
2013 deaths
People from Surat Thani province